Guilt Is My Shadow is a 1950 British drama film directed by Roy Kellino and starring Elizabeth Sellars, Patrick Holt and Peter Reynolds. In the film, a woman is haunted by her conscience after she kills a man and hides the body. It is based on the 1943 novel You're Best Alone by Norah Lofts.

Plot
Jamie (Reynolds) is the getaway driver for a gang of robbers, but when the robbery goes wrong he drives off and makes his way by car and then train to a rural village, Welford, in Devon, where his estranged uncle, Kit (Holt), lives alone. Although Kit is not particularly pleased to see Jamie, he allows him to stay for a couple of days.

A couple of days' stopover turns into an indefinite period, as Jamie, all the while sneering at Kit's rural life, gets a job (or is it a partnership?) at the local garage and eats Kit out of house and home. Things get momentarily worse for Kit as Jamie's estranged wife Linda (Sellars) turns up, hoping for reconciliation, but although Kit is wary of another unwanted guest at first, Linda is far more amenable than Jamie, whose attention has been diverted away by Betty (Morris), a single woman in the village whom he starts an affair with.

Jamie is found to be stealing from Kit as well as the garage and when Linda confronts him he assaults her, and she kills him accidentally in an act of self-defence. Kit and Linda decide to hide the body, which draws them even closer together, and after telling the few people that are interested that Jamie has left the farm, life continues as before with Kit and Linda having fallen in love. Linda is still haunted by memories of Jamie however, and the situation becomes worse when Jamie's mother Eva (Avice Landone) arrives unexpectedly to see Jamie.

Linda suffers something akin to a nervous breakdown, and the local doctor called to assist becomes suspicious at Linda's condition and actions, and calls the police. The police arrive and search for Jamie's body but are unable to find it, and are about to leave, when Linda's conscience gets the better of her and she calls them back to the house, presumably to make a complete confession and face the consequences, with Kit by her side.

This departs from the plot of the original Norah Lofts novel, with its far more appropriate title, You're Best Alone, in which it is Kit who accidentally kills Jamie, and is in love with pathetic Linda. Her subsequent pregnancy is certainly Jamie's though she tells naïve Kit it is his. Her extravagant and extreme fear of childbirth leads her to a kind of emotional breakdown in which she tells police that Kit murdered her husband Jamie. The body is not found, but Kit commits suicide, alone with his beloved dog who he shoots first, reasoning she is too old to take to a new master. His note absolves Linda completely though she was certainly complicit.  He does this for love of her, and for Jamie whom he disliked and disapproved of, but who was his much-loved sister's son and who was nothing as glamorous as a getaway driver,  but rather a middle class,  though seedy, con man. The book is a genuine tragedy.

Locations

An early shot is of the Torbay Express at Paddington and the scene then shifts to a shot of a down express at Coryton's Cove, Dawlish. There follow many scenes shot at Ashburton with Tillingham's garage being located next door to the site of the former Golden Lion hotel.  Linda arrives by train at Staverton railway station where steam engines still run on the South Devon Railway (heritage railway) but the shot of her leaving the station jumps back to Ashburton. Recognisable coastal scenes are in Torquay where Thatcher's Rock, Hope's Nose and Long Quarry Point under Wall's Hill all appear in shot. The outdoor shots of the farmhouse were at Whitedell Farm, Sarratt, Hertfordshire

The internal scenes are not very convincing representations of rural Devon architecture.

Cast
 Elizabeth Sellars as Linda
 Patrick Holt as Kit
 Peter Reynolds as Jamie
 Lana Morris as Betty
 Avice Landone as Eva
 Lawrence O'Madden as Tom
 Wensley Pithey as Tillingham
 Esma Cannon as Peggy
 Aubrey Woods as Doctor
 Willoughby Gray as Detective

Critical reception
Allmovie wrote, "setting this one apart from other British crime mellers of the era was the decision to film on location in a remote rural community. A passable timefiller when first released, Guilt is My Shadow ended up a staple of American TV in the 1950s and 1960s."

References

External links

1950 films
1950 crime drama films
British black-and-white films
British crime drama films
Films about bank robbery
Films based on British novels
Films directed by Roy Kellino
Films set in Devon
Films set in London
Films shot at Associated British Studios
Films shot in Devon
1950s English-language films
1950s British films